Sir Geoffrey Stephen William Organe FRCS (25 December 1908 – 7 January 1989) was an English anaesthetist and the dean of the Royal College of Anaesthetists from 1958 to 1961.

References

Deans of the Royal College of Anaesthetists
English anaesthetists
Fellows of the Royal College of Surgeons
1908 births
1989 deaths
Knights Bachelor
Presidents of the Association of Anaesthetists